Lin Kun-hai (10 February 1954 – 14 February 2022) was a Taiwanese program producer and entrepreneur, co-founder and chairman of Sanlih E-Television.

Life and career 
Lin was born in Kaohsiung and grew up in Kaohsiung City. Prior to founding a video rental shop as a joint venture with his wife and brother-in-law Chang Rong-hua, Lin was a taxi driver. In 1983, Lin, his wife Chang Hsiu, and his brother-in-law Chang Rong-hua jointly established Sanlih Film and Television, purchasing machines, duplicating videotapes, and then renting out videotape rental shops. Lin was regarded as the leader of the Taiwan Forward faction within the Democratic Progressive Party, and mounted an unsuccessful independent legislative campaign in 2001.

Death 
Lin suffered from oral cancer for many years and died at Kaohsiung Veterans General Hospital, on 14 February 2022, at the age of 68.

References 

1954 births
2022 deaths
Businesspeople from Kaohsiung
Television company founders
Sanlih E-Television
Deaths from cancer in Taiwan
20th-century Taiwanese businesspeople
Taiwanese company founders
Deaths from oral cancer